Lisa Lynn Masters (March 20, 1964 – November 15, 2016) was an American actress, writer and model.

Early life and education
Masters was born in Omaha, Nebraska, and raised in Asheville, North Carolina. She graduated from Appalachian State University in broadcasting with a minor in modern dance. She later attended Columbia University Graduate School of Journalism.

Career
After college, Masters worked as a model and news reporter and landed an uncredited role as a news reporter in the feature film The Siege. She appeared in TV commercials and, later, the feature films The Stepford Wives and It's Complicated.

Masters continued modeling and acted in several television series, including an episode each in Law & Order: Criminal Intent and Law & Order: Special Victims Unit, Ugly Betty, Iron Fist, Gossip Girl, Nashville and Unbreakable Kimmy Schmidt. She committed suicide at age 52 while on a model assignment in Peru.

Filmography

References

External links

1964 births
2016 deaths
American film actresses
American television actresses
21st-century American actresses
Actresses from North Carolina
Actresses from Omaha, Nebraska
2016 suicides
Suicides by hanging
Suicides in Peru